Polling for the next Tunisian presidential election, which will take place on 15 September 2019, with a runoff on 13 October 2019.

Second round

Polls

First round

Polls

See also

2019 Tunisian presidential election
2019 in Tunisia
List of elections in 2019

References

Opinion polling in Tunisia